Lahan (लहान) is a city and municipality with 24 wards  in Siraha District in the Madhesh Province south-eastern Nepal. It is connected with Mahendra Highway, which is also called the east–west highway. It is located nearly 261 km east of the capital, Kathmandu via B.P. highway and E-W Highway & 424 km east via Narayanghat-Mugling Highway. Lahan is located at the latitude of 26.717 and longitude of 86.483. It is at an elevation of 111 meters above sea level. It follows Nepali time zone, UTC Offset: +05:45 hours.

Laukaha in India and nearby town of Thadi which is 18 km South of Lahan in Nepal are a part of one of the agreed route for Mutual Trade between India and Nepal. Lahan connects Thadi to rest of Nepal. Nepal Government of Nepal has set up a dedicated customs office in the town. and Government of India has set up a Land Customs Station with a Superintendent level officer. So, in simple import and export are allowed in this location.

The population has increased gradually due to urbanisation over a period of 20 years. This city has become a market hub in the eastern part of Province No. 2. Many people come from Udaypur for sales and shopping as well.

Popular Places
The town is popular for Sagarmatha Choudhary Eye Hospital, Lahan a non-profit eye hospital serving residents of Eastern Nepal and neighboring districts of India. Lot of people visit the town for eye and related treatment from Indian border districts of Supaul; Saharsha; Darbhanga and Madhubani via Thadi border.

Air Transport
Rajbiraj Airport is the nearest airport 43.1 Km away from Lahan where daily 1 flight from Rajbiraj to the capital city Kathmandu is operated with the flight time of 35 minutes.

Railways
The city is also connected to Laukaha Bazar railway station which is located in nearby Indian town of Laukaha, 18 km south via Nepali town of Thadi which is one of the main entry and exit point for people of Nepal and India.

References

External links
 Lahan Municipality

Populated places in Siraha District
Nepal municipalities established in 1976
Municipalities in Madhesh Province